(For the current top-level subdivision of Nelson in New Zealand, see Marlborough region)

The Marlborough Province operated as a province of New Zealand from 1 November 1859, when it split away from Nelson Province, until the abolition of provincial government in 1876.

History
Marlborough split away from the Nelson Province because the majority of the income of the Provincial Council came from land sales in the Marlborough region, but the funds were mostly used in the Nelson region. Land sales in Nelson and Marlborough netted the Nelson Provincial Council £33,000 and £160,000, respectively. Of that, £200 were expended benefiting the Marlborough region. Marlborough settlers successfully petitioned for a split from Nelson. Another reason was that large landholders feared the growing influence of smaller farmers and urban residents. By splitting the Marlborough Province off with its large farms, it was easier for these landholders to control the provincial council.

When the province was formed, Sir Thomas Gore Browne, the Governor of New Zealand, named it after John Churchill, 1st Duke of Marlborough. The settlement of Blenheim was subsequently named after the Battle of Blenheim (1704), where troops led by the Duke defeated a combined French and Bavarian force at the village of Blenheim (Blindheim) in Germany.

Area

The Marlborough Province was notable for its intense personal rivalries among its politicians. This led to a farcical change of capital from at first Blenheim, then Picton from 1861, and back again to Blenheim from July 1865. In a symbolic way, government buildings in both Blenheim and Picton burned down some months after the abolition of the provincial system.

Marlborough was not systematically settled like other regions, but capital-rich settlers from the Nelson area spilled over who wanted to invest in large land holdings. Frederick Weld was the first in 1847 to land sheep at Port Underwood, a sheltered harbour which forms the north-east extension of Cloudy Bay in the Marlborough Sounds. Because of its early start in sheep farming, other South Island areas were stocked from here.

Anniversary Day
New Zealand law provides an anniversary day for each former province. Marlborough celebrates its founding on a Monday near 1 November each year.

Superintendents
The Marlborough Province had five Superintendents:

Legislation 
 Picton Institute Act 1864

References

External links
 Map of provincial boundaries

Provinces of New Zealand
States and territories established in 1859
1876 disestablishments in New Zealand
1859 establishments in New Zealand